KYNG (1590 kHz) is a commercial AM radio station licensed to Springdale, Arkansas.  The station broadcasts a sports format. The station is currently owned by Cumulus Media.  It is programmed along with co-owned 92.1 KQSM-FM as "The Ticket."  Both stations carry nationally syndicated sports shows from CBS Sports Radio.

History
The station was assigned the call letters KQXK on November 17, 1980. On September 8, 1994, the station changed its call sign to KZRA, on December 7, 2005, to the current KYNG, 
and on February 19, 2003, the station was sold to Cumulus Licensing Corp.

References

External links

YNG
Springdale, Arkansas
Radio stations established in 1980
Cumulus Media radio stations